May Bukas Pa may refer to:
May Bukas Pa (2000 TV series), a Philippine TV series from 2000 to 2001
May Bukas Pa (2009 TV series), a Philippine TV series from 2009 to 2010
"May Bukas Pa", a song by Rico J. Puno